Ronnie Gene Flippo  (born August 15, 1937) is an American politician and accountant who served seven terms as a United States Congressman from Alabama from 1977 to 1991.

Life
Flippo was born August 15, 1937 in Florence, Alabama to Claude Nathaniel Flippo and Esther McAfee.  He attended the University of North Alabama and earned a Bachelor of Science degree in Accounting.  This was followed up by a master's degree in accounting from the University of Alabama.  Flippo worked as a CPA after graduating from college, eventually starting his own accounting firm in 1971.

Politics
In 1970, he successfully ran as a Democrat for a seat in the Alabama House of Representatives.  After one term, he gave up his House seat to run for the Alabama Senate, again becoming a successful candidate.

In 1976, Flippo was elected to Congress.  He served in the House until 1991, when he retired from his seat to run for Governor of Alabama. He was defeated in his bid for governor and began a private management consulting firm, R.G. Flippo & Associates.

References

External links
 
 

1937 births
Living people
Democratic Party Alabama state senators
American members of the Churches of Christ
Democratic Party members of the Alabama House of Representatives
Politicians from Florence, Alabama
University of Alabama alumni
University of North Alabama alumni
Democratic Party members of the United States House of Representatives from Alabama
Members of Congress who became lobbyists